Dawanshan Dao, or Dawanshan Island, is an island in the southwest Wanshan Archipelago, offshore of Zhuhai, Guangdong in China. Xiaowanshan Dao is located in the west of Dawanshan Dao. Dawanshan Dao has an area of 8.1 km2 and a population of about 3,000. The seat of Wanshan Town of Zhuhai is located on the island.

Geography
Dawanding on Dawanshan Dao has an altitude of 443.13 m.

Economy
Dawanshan Dao is located in one of the major fishing areas of China. However, Perna viridis, a species of green mussel, was found to be contaminated by HCHs, DDTs, and PCBs. Dawanshan Dao has reservoirs because of the lack of sufficient freshwater.

Transportation
Dawanshan Dao is accessible through ferry service from the Xiangzhou Northern Wharf of Zhuhai.

See also

 Wanshan Archipelago Campaign

References

External links

 Pictures of Dawanshan Dao:   

Wanshan Archipelago
Populated places in China
Islands of Guangdong
Islands of China